Mosharrafeh-ye Bozorg (also Romanized as Mosharfeh-ye Bozorg, Mosherfeh Bozorg, Mosherfeh-ye Bozorg, and Moshīrafeh-ye Bozorg) is a village in Gheyzaniyeh Rural District, in the Central District of Ahvaz County, Khuzestan Province, Iran. At the 2006 census, its population was 334, in 61 families.

References 

Populated places in Ahvaz County